Spock is a fictional character from the Star Trek franchise.

Spock or Mr. Spock may also refer to:

People
 Benjamin Spock (1903–1998), American pediatrician and author
 Marjorie Spock (1904–2008), American environmentalist and writer, sister of Benjamin
 A metonym for Leonard Nimoy, who played the character Spock
 "Mr. Spock", a nickname given basketball player Tim Duncan by opposing fans for his stoic demeanor

Music
 S.P.O.C.K, a Swedish synthpop band
 Spock drum, used with tenor drums

Computing
 Spock (website), a search engine on people
 Spock (testing framework), for software

Other uses
 2309 Mr. Spock, an asteroid
 Spock, a windsurfing move

See also
 
 SPOCK1, a human gene encoding the protein Testican-1
 SPOCK2, a human gene encoding the protein Testican-2
 "Spocking", making Canadian five-dollar note portraits resemble the character Spock
 Spöck (disambiguation)